Kung Ikaw Ay Isang Panaginip is a 2002 Filipino romantic comedy and fantasy film directed by Wenn V. Deramas and produced by Star Cinema. The cast was led by Jolina Magdangal, with Leandro Muñoz and Rafael Rosell in his introducing film. It is Magdangal's first solo starring film and her first and only film opposite Muñoz and Rosell.

In the 2000’s this was her last film with her Movie studio from 2003-2007 she did Movies with Viva Films and GMA Films in ensemble or lead films

Cast

Main cast
 Jolina Magdangal as Rosalie
 Leandro Muñoz as Eric
 Rafael Rosell as Paolo

Special participation
 Nida Blanca as Fairy

Supporting cast
 John Lapus as Sugar
 Kaye Abad as Peachy
 Boboy Garovillo as Felipe
 Eugene Domingo as Josie
 Denise Joaquin as Beauty
 Rio Locsin as Helen
 Aljon Valdenibro as Niño

Others
 Karla Estrada as Bebang/Bisaya
 Justin Cuyugan as Wen/Ilokano
 Marvin Martinez as Shawie
 Michael Pamular as Age
 Athenea Pla as Korinna
 Nicole Hofer as Silk sister
 Cy Jaravata as Silk sister
 Don Laurel as Gym instructor boyfriend
 Roderick Lindayag as Pulis boyfriend
 Justine Estacio as Beauty's new boyfriend
 JR Luzarraga as Sugar's boyfriend
 Christian Santino as Mall guy
 Ced Torrecarion as Church guy
 CJ Tolentino as Bar guy
 Kathy Despa as Bar girl
 Julie Ann Cañeda as Billboard girl

Reception

Box office
Although Magdangal did not attend the premiere night due to her commitment to her concert tour in the United States, the film was commercially successful. On its opening day, Kung Ikaw Ay Isang Panaginip registered the highest box office receipts compared to its competitions. For the box office success of the film, Magdangal received the citation Princess of Philippine Movies in the 33rd Box Office Entertainment Awards.

Critical response
The film received positive reviews from moviegoers and film critics with Butch Francisco of the Philippine Star saying "Kung Ikaw ay Isang Panaginip... is a fun movie to watch. Call it baduy if you wish, but we cannot close our eyes to the fact that it is a decently-made movie ... it is a very small movie with an obviously tight budget but I do appreciate the fact that it is inventive, creative and very energetic – with its every scene well-planned and well-thought of... It is a far cry from those usual small-budgeted run-of-the-mill Tagalog pictures that are downright stupid and assault the sensibilities of the viewers... Kung Ikaw ay Isang Panaginip is cute, fun and perky. More importantly, it stresses old positive values and traits that are so sorely lacking in most of our films today."

The film also marks Magdangal's first film without her long time screen partner Marvin Agustin, of which the team up has produced successful films in the past in FLAMES: The Movie (1997), Kung Ayaw Mo, Huwag Mo! (1998), Labs Kita... Okey Ka Lang? (1998), GIMIK: The Reunion and Hey Babe! (both 1999). Despite this, Magdangal's pairing with Rosell and Munoz in Kung Ikaw Ay Isang Panaginip received positive feedbacks from moviegoers.

Soundtrack
 Panaginip
 Music: Lorie Ilustre
 Words: Dennis Garcia
 Arranger: Isaias Nalasa
 Performer: Jolina Magdangal

 Ay, Ay, Ay Pag-Ibig
 Composer: Norman Caraan
 Performer: Denise Joaquin

Note: Panaginip was later included in Magdangal's compilation album Jolina: Platinum Hits Collection released on 2002 by Star Music.

Notes
The film marks Nida Blanca's last film after she was stabbed to death in a condo parking in Makati City, Philippines on 7 November 2001. It was reported that Blanca's spirit was allegedly felt in the studio where Magdangal was dubbing her scenes with the actress. Producer Lita Santos later revealed that Blanca admires Magdangal seeing her youth in the latter. Blanca and Magdangal has starred in two other films before Kung Ikaw Ay Isang Panaginip, in Hataw Na (1995) and Ang TV Movie: The Adarna Adventures (1996).
Magdangal's Kung Ikaw Ay Isang Panaginip (Star Cinema) and Judy Ann Santos' film May Pag-ibig Pa Kaya? (Starlight Films) were released on the same day  (January 30, 2002), and the consecutive release developed their natural rivalry with critics believing that said rivalry is their generation's version, popularity wise, of the country's top rivalries in Gloria Romero and Nida Blanca and Nora Aunor and Vilma Santos.
In 2003, Director Wenn Deramas revealed Kung Ikaw Ay Isang Panaginip as one of his favorite directorial films.

References

External links
 

2002 films
Films directed by Wenn V. Deramas